The Kalakan is a river in Transbaikalia, southern East Siberia, Russia. The Kalakan gives its name to the Kalakan Range, as well as to the Kalakan Depression. 

The Kalakan river is a destination for rafting. Taimen and lenok are among the fish species found in the river.

Course

The Kalakan is a right tributary of the Vitim. Its sources are in the Kalakan Range, at the eastern edge of the Vitim Plateau, where it flows first to the north. After a short distance it bends to the left and flows in a WSW direction along the feet of the Yankan Range, which separates it from the course of the Kalar to the north. The Kalakan Range rises above the left bank of the river. Finally the Kalakan meets the Vitim at the Buryatian border  from the Vitim's mouth in the Lena.

The river is frozen between mid October and mid May. The area is marked by permafrost.

See also
List of rivers of Russia

References

External links
Калакан 1
Калакан 2
Калакан 1997

Rivers of Zabaykalsky Krai